Druzhnaya Gorka is the name of several inhabited localities in Russia.

Urban localities
Druzhnaya Gorka, Leningrad Oblast, an urban-type settlement under the administrative jurisdiction of Druzhnogorskoye Settlement Municipal Formation in Gatchinsky District of Leningrad Oblast; 

Rural localities
Druzhnaya Gorka, Novgorod Oblast, a village in Berezovikskoye Settlement of Okulovsky District in Novgorod Oblast
Druzhnaya Gorka, Tver Oblast, a village in Okovetskoye Rural Settlement of Selizharovsky District in Tver Oblast